Kelvin 'Kelly' Thomas Lightfoot (1925-date of death unknown) was a former South African international lawn bowler.

Bowls career

World Championships
Lightfoot came to prominence in 1966 when he won a triples bronze medal at the 1966 World Outdoor Bowls Championship. Ten years later in 1976 he won the triples, fours and team gold medal at the World Outdoor Championships in Johannesburg. In the Triples with Kevin Campbell and Nando Gatti they won 14 of their 15 matches. In the fours with Campbell, Gatti and Bill Moseley they repeated the feat of winning 14 of the 15 matches played.

The South African team completed a clean sweep of all events at the 1976 World Outdoor Bowls Championship. The lawn bowlers from South Africa were denied further opportunities to win medals due to the Sporting boycott of South Africa during the apartheid era.

National
Lightfoot won the 1959 pairs title,  1962 singles and fours titles and 1969 singles at the South African National Bowls Championships. He was the first winner of the national masters and would have won more frequently but suffered from a back injury.

Personal life
By trade he was a clerk in the South African Railway Offices in Pietermaritzburg. He married in 1948.

References

South African male bowls players
1925 births
Bowls World Champions
Date of death unknown